Abisara burnii or White-spotted Judy, is a butterfly in the family Riodinidae. It is found in the Indomalayan realm.

Subspecies
Abisara burnii burnii (Assam)
Abisara burnii timaeus (Fruhstorfer, 1904) (northern Indo China)
Abisara burnii assus Fruhstorfer, 1914 (southern China)
Abisara burnii etymander (Fruhstorfer, 1908) (Taiwan)

References

Butterflies described in 1895
Abisara
Butterflies of Asia